Sinan Antoon, is an Iraqi poet, novelist, scholar, and literary translator. He has been described as "one of the most acclaimed authors of the Arab world." He is an associate professor at the Gallatin School of Individualized Study at New York University.

Life and career 
Antoon was born in 1967 in Baghdad. He received his B.A. in English with distinction from the University of Baghdad in 1990 with minors in Arabic and Translation. He left Iraq in 1991 after the onset of the Gulf War and moved to the United States. He completed an M.A. in Arab Studies from Georgetown University in 1995. In 2006, he received his Ph.D. from Harvard University in Arabic and Islamic Studies. His doctoral dissertation was the first study on the 10th century poet, Ibn al-Hajjaj and the genre of poetry he pioneered.

"He was one of a coterie of dissident diasporic Iraqi intellectuals who opposed the 2003 US occupation of his homeland that led to the current post-colonial quagmire." Antoon was featured in the 2003 documentary film About Baghdad, which he also co-directed and co-produced.

His articles have appeared in The Guardian, The New York Times, The Nation, and in pan-Arab dailies including al-Hayat, al-Akhbar and as-Safir  where he writes a weekly opinion column.

His poems and novels have been translated to nine languages. He is also a co-founder and co-editor of the e-zine Jadaliyya.

Literary works

Poetry 

Antoon has published two collection of poetry in Arabic: Mawshur Muballal bil-Hurub (A Prism: Wet with Wars) (2003, Cairo) and Laylun Wahidun fi Kull al-Mudun (One Night in All Cities) (Beirut: Dar al-Jamal, 2010). He has published a collection in English entitled The Baghdad Blues (Harbor Mountain Press, 2006).

Novels 

Antoon has published four novels:

 (Beirut: Dar al-Adab, 2002 and later al-Jamal, 2014) was widely acclaimed in the Arab world and described as "the Iraqi novel par excellence." It was translated to English by Rebecca Johnson and the author as I`jaam: An Iraqi Rhapsody and published by CityLights Books in 2006. Other translations include German ( (Lenos), Norwegian, Italian, and Portuguese.

 (The Pomegranate Alone) (Beirut: Dar al-Jamal, 2010) was translated by the author and published by Yale University Press in 2013 as The Corpse Washer and was longlisted for the Independent Prize for Foreign Fiction. It won the 2014 Saif Ghobash Banipal Prize for Literary Translation. The Argentinian writer Alberto Manguel described as "one of the most extraordinary novels he's read in a long time." The French translation was published by Actes Sud in 2017 and won the 2017  for the best Arabic novel translated to French in 2017. Its translation in Malayalam language in the title   was done by Dr. Shamnad N, Head of the department, University College, Trivandrum, Kerala. 

 (Ave Maria) (Beirut: Dar al-Jamal, 2012) was shortlisted for the International Prize for Arabic Fiction (The Arabic Booker) and was translated to Spanish by María Luz Comendador and published by Turner Libros in May 2014 under the title . The English translation (by Maia Tabet) was published in 2017 as The Baghdad Eucharist by Hoopoe Books (AUC Press).

 (Index) (Beirut: Dar al-Jamal, 2016). Was longlisted for the International Prize for Arabic Fiction.

Honors and awards
 2017 Prix de la Litterature Arabe for "Seul le Grenadier" (Actes Sud, 2017, tr. Leila Mansur) (Wahdaha Shajarat al-Rumman/The Corpse Washer).
 2017 "Fihris"(Index) longlisted for the International Prize for Arabic Fiction.
2016/2017: Fellow at the Wissenschaftskolleg zu Berlin (Institute of Advanced Study in Berlin).
2014: Saif Ghobash Prize for Literary Translation for his translation of his own novel The Corpse Washer (The first self-translation to win the prize.)
2014: Arab American Book Award for The Corpse Washer
2014: Lannan Residency (Marfa, TX).
2013:Ya Maryam (Ave Maria) shortlisted for the 2013 International Prize of Arabic Fiction (The Arabic Booker)
2013: Berlin Prize Fellow at the American Academy in Berlin 
2012: National Translation Award for his translation of Mahmoud Darwish's In the Presence of Absence from the American Literary Translators Association
2008: Postdoctoral Fellowship: EUME (Europe in the Middle East/The Middle East in Europe), Berlin, Germany.
2002: Mellon Fellowship for Dissertation Research in Original Sources.

Works
Books
The Poetics of the Obscene: Ibn al-Hajjaj and Sukhf. Harvard University Press. 2006.
The Baghdad Blues. Harbor Mountain Press. 2007. .
 
 Ya Maryam (Ave Maria). Dar al-Jamal. 2012. 

The Baghdad Eucharist. Oxford University Press. 2017. .
The Book of Collateral Damage. Yale University Press. 28 May 2019. .

Film

 About Baghdad

See also

 Iraqi art
 List of Iraqi artists

Further reading
Iğsız, Aslii. "Conversation with Sinan Antoon: Poet and Novelist." University of Arizona Poetry Center.

References

External links
Official Website
New York University Biography
Democracy Now! Biography

 Biography from the Berlin International Literature Festival

Living people
1967 births
Georgetown University Graduate School of Arts and Sciences alumni
Harvard Graduate School of Arts and Sciences alumni
New York University faculty
Middle Eastern studies scholars
Writers from Baghdad
American people of Iraqi descent
21st-century Iraqi novelists
Iraqi film directors
20th-century Iraqi poets
University of Baghdad alumni
21st-century Iraqi poets